The Exeter Sandstone is a geologic formation exposed in northeastern New Mexico. Its age is poorly controlled, but it is thought to have been deposited during the middle Jurassic.

Description
It unconformably overlies the Sheep Pen Sandstone and is in turn overlain by the Bell Ranch Formation. The Exeter Formation varies greatly in thickness, with the maximum thickness in synclinal valleys of the underlying Dockum Group and the formation being absent on some anticlinal crests of the Dockum Group.

The formation has long been thought to have formed in the eastern part of the Entrada Formation dune sea and thus to be correlative with the Entrada Formation, and Spencer G. Lucas and coinvestigators recommended demoting the Exeter Sandstone to member rank within the Entrada Formation. However, age control is poor on the Exeter Sandstone, and other investigators have retained the Exeter Sandstone at formation rank until the correlation becomes clearer.

History of investigation
The formation was first named by W.T. Lee in 1902 for exposures near the Exter Post Office.

See also

 List of fossiliferous stratigraphic units in Colorado
 Paleontology in Colorado

Footnotes

References
 
 
 
 
 
 
 

Jurassic formations of New Mexico